Glyptopetalum quadrangulare is a plant in the family Celastraceae. The specific epithet  is from the Latin meaning "four-angled", referring to the winged twigs.

Description
The flowers are greenish-yellow.

Distribution and habitat
Glyptopetalum quadrangulare grows naturally in Burma, Sumatra, Peninsular Malaysia and Borneo. Its habitat is lowland forests.

References

quadrangulare
Flora of Myanmar
Flora of Sumatra
Flora of Peninsular Malaysia
Flora of Borneo